Ala-Buka a village which is the seat of Ala-Buka District of Jalal-Abad Region, Kyrgyzstan. Its population was 15,426 in 2021.

It is about 25 km southwest of Kerben on the main highway. The Kasansay reservoir is located to the southwest. 14 km to the east is the 12th century Mausoleum of Safed-Bulan and Shakh Fazil, a place of pilgrimage. Shakh Fazil is reputed to have first brought Islam to the area. Safed Bulan was a pious woman who is said to have buried the heads of Muslim soldiers who were beheaded after a battle.

Population

References

Populated places in Jalal-Abad Region